Pedace is a frazione in the comune of Casali del Manco, in the province of Cosenza, Calabria, southern Italy. It lost its comune status in 2017 after a referendum,   along with four other municipalities.

Geography 
The village lies at the foot of Mount Stella, commonly known as the dialect of "Timpune e Stilla". It overlooks valley of river Cardone, extending to the  Sila range.

References

Cities and towns in Calabria